The 2012 15U Baseball World Championship was the first under-15 international baseball competition held in Chihuahua, Mexico, from August 16 to August 26, 2012.

Teams
The tournament was slated to include 16 teams from across the world as three groups have been formed. After Colombia and Uganda withdrew from the competition, IBAF swapped Honduras and Argentina. Due to the non-appearance of Bahamas, the organizers updated the schedule.

 
 Chinese Taipei is the official IBAF designation for the team representing the state officially referred to as the Republic of China, more commonly known as Taiwan. (See also political status of Taiwan for details.)

Round 1

Group A

Standings

Schedule

Group B

Standings

Schedule

Group C

Standings

Schedule

Round 2

Group 1

Standings

Schedule

References

U-15 Baseball World Cup
15U Baseball World Cup
15U Baseball World Cup
15U Baseball World Cup
2012
15U Baseball World Cup